Roger Jouve (born 11 March 1949) is a French former professional footballer who played as a midfielder. Throughout his club career, he played for French sides OGC Nice and RC Strasbourg. At international level, he represented the France national football team on seven occasions between 1973 and 1979, scoring once.

Honours
RC Strasbourg
French championship: 1978–79 

OGC Nice
Division 2: 1969–70

References
Profile
Stats

1949 births
Living people
French footballers
France international footballers
Association football midfielders
OGC Nice players
RC Strasbourg Alsace players
Footballers from Marseille